Ellis University was an accredited online for-profit college, based in Oakbrook Terrace, Illinois. The university offered online and in class undergraduate degrees in child development, interdisciplinary studies, accounting, business administration, and computer science, and graduate degrees in communications, business administration, and computer science. Ellis University was accredited by the Distance Education Accrediting Commission (DEAC). Ellis University was issued a show cause by DEAC and, while operating under threat of removal of accreditation, withdrew its accreditation on September 29, 2016. On December 1, 2016 Ellis University ceased operations after a show-cause was issued by their accreditor.

History
Ellis University was founded in 2008 in Chicago.

It was bought in 2012 and changed its name to John Hancock University. In 2015, it changed its name back to Ellis University.

Academics

Undergraduate
 Bachelor of Arts in Child Development
 Bachelor of Arts in Interdisciplinary Studies
 Bachelor of Science in Accounting
 Bachelor of Science in Business Administration
 Bachelor of Science in Computer Science

Graduate
 Master of Arts in Communication Arts
 Master of Business Administration
 Master of Science in Computer Science

References

External links
 Official Ellis University website

1999 establishments in Illinois
Distance education institutions based in the United States
Educational institutions established in 1999
For-profit universities and colleges in the United States
Privately held companies based in Illinois
Universities and colleges in DuPage County, Illinois
Oakbrook Terrace, Illinois
Defunct private universities and colleges in Illinois